Jiří Skobla (6 April 1930 – 18 November 1978) was a Czechoslovak athlete who competed mainly in the shot put. Born in Prague, he was the son of former Olympic weightlifting champion Jaroslav Skobla.

His first success was a gold medal at the 1954 European Athletics Championships – a feat that no other Czech has been able to replicate since. He was the bronze medallist at the event at the 1958 European Athletics Championships and placed sixth in 1962. He competed for Czechoslovakia at the Olympics on three occasions: 1952, 1956 and 1960. His best performance was in the 1956 Summer Olympics held in Melbourne, Australia, where he won the bronze medal. His final international medal, a bronze, came at the 1966 European Indoor Games.

Skobla died of kidney cancer in Prague. The autopsy results were not released, but it was widely believed his death may have been associated with steroid use.

References

Wallechinsky, David and Jaime Loucky (2008). "Track & Field (Men): Shot Put". In The Complete Book of the Olympics: 2008 Edition. London: Aurum Press Limited. pp. 236–7.

1930 births
1978 deaths
Athletes (track and field) at the 1952 Summer Olympics
Athletes (track and field) at the 1956 Summer Olympics
Athletes (track and field) at the 1960 Summer Olympics
Czechoslovak male shot putters
Deaths from kidney cancer
Olympic bronze medalists for Czechoslovakia
Olympic athletes of Czechoslovakia
Czech male shot putters
European Athletics Championships medalists
Athletes from Prague
Medalists at the 1956 Summer Olympics
Olympic bronze medalists in athletics (track and field)